A list of films produced by the Bollywood film industry based in Mumbai in 1921:

1921 in Indian cinema
Star of the East film company was started in Madras by R. S. Prakash.

Films
Bhakta Vidur directed by Kanjibhai Rathod and produced by Kohinoor Film Company was the first Indian cinema film to face a ban, leading to a "major censorship row".  Cited by Rajadhyaksha and Willemen as "One of the most famous silent mythologicals", the film featured Vidur in Gandhian attire complete with Gandhi cap and the Khaddar shirt. The film was banned in Karachi and Madras. It had the owners of Kohinoor playing the main roles, with Dwarkadas Sampat as Vidur and Maneklal Patel as Krishna, while the role of Duryodhan was enacted by Homi Master.
Bhisma Pratighna, Telugu film industry's first feature film, was released in 1921. The film was directed by Raghupathi Venkaya co-directed by R.S. Prakash.
Bilat Ferat or Bilet Pherat a.k.a. England Returned was the acting debut of Dhirendranath Ganguly who co-directed and produced the film under his Indo-British Film banner. The film is the first full-length Bengali feature film. It was also stated to be the first "love story" shown in Indian cinema.
Mahasati Ansuya also called Sati Ansuya was directed by Kanjibhai Rathod for Kohinoor Film Company. It starred Sakina and Vaidya. According to Rajadhyaksha and Willemen, the film was a success at the box office and "gained notoriety for a nude shot of Sakina".
Nal Damayanti, a mythological, was one of the notable films of 1921. Directed by Eugenio de Liguoro for Madan Theatres, it starred Patience Cooper, E. D. Liguoro and D. Sarkari. It was cited to be the first international co-production with Italy.
Surekha Haran was directed by Baburao Painter for Maharashtra Film Company. Painter hired V. Shantaram, who had been employed by the studio doing all-purpose jobs, to play the role of Krishna. Shantaram's acting in the film brought him into prominence leading to several small roles till Savkari Pash where he was cast in the main role.

A-P

R-Z

References

External links
Bollywood films of 1921 at IMDb

1921
Bollywood
Films, Bollywood